Alan King (born 1966) is a Scottish racehorse trainer specialising mainly in National Hunt racing. He is based at Barbury Castle stables near Wroughton, Wiltshire.

He worked as assistant trainer to David Nicholson until Nicholson's retirement and then took out a licence to train himself, first at Jackdaw's Castle stables, before moving to Barbury Castle in June 2000.

His biggest wins at the Cheltenham Festival have come with My Way de Solzen in the 2006 World Hurdle, Voy Por Ustedes in the 2007 Queen Mother Champion Chase, Katchit in the 2008 Champion Hurdle, Oh Crick in the 2009 Johnny Henderson Grand Annual Chase and Uxizandre in the 2015 Ryanair Chase Despite a terrible year with injuries, the yard also had a 1–2 in the 2013 Coral Cup Handicap Hurdle with Medinas and Meister Eckhart.

His principal stable jockey until October 2019 was Wayne Hutchinson.

Cheltenham winners (16)
 Queen Mother Champion Chase - (1) Voy Por Ustedes (2007)
 Champion Hurdle - (1)  Katchit (2008)
 Stayers' Hurdle - (1)  My Way de Solzen (2006)
 Ryanair Chase - (1) Uxizandre (2015) 
 Arkle Challenge Trophy -(3)  Voy Por Ustedes (2006), My Way de Solzen (2007), Edwardstone (2022)
 Triumph Hurdle - (2)  Penzance (2002), Katchit (2007) 
 Spa Novices' Hurdle - (1)  Nenuphar Collonges (2008) 
 Festival Trophy Handicap Chase - (2)  Fork Lightning (2004), Bensalem (2011)
 National Hunt Chase Challenge Cup - (2)  Old Benny (2008), Midnight Prayer (2014) 
 Coral Cup - (1)  Medinas (2013) 
 Johnny Henderson Grand Annual Chase - (1)  Oh Crick (2009)

Major wins

 Great Britain
 Goodwood Cup - (1)  Trueshan (2021) 
 Long Walk Hurdle - (2)  Anzum (1999), My Way de Solzen (2005)
 Henry VIII Novices' Chase - (3)  Araldur (2008), Sceau Royal (2017), Edwardstone (2021) 
 Christmas Hurdle - (1)  Yanworth (2016) 
 Finale Juvenile Hurdle - (2)  Franchoek (2007), Walkon (2008) 
 Challow Novices' Hurdle - (1)  Messire Des Obeaux (2017) 
 Scilly Isles Novices' Chase - (1)  Medermit (2011) 
 Anniversary 4-Y-O Novices' Hurdle - (4)  Katchit (2007), Walkon (2009), Grumeti (2012), L'Unique (2013) 
 Arkle Challenge Trophy - (1) - Edwardstone (2022)
 Ascot Chase - (2)  Voy Por Ustedes (2009), Balder Succes (2015) 
 Manifesto Novices' Chase - (1)  Uxizandre (2018) 
 Melling Chase - (2)  Voy Por Ustedes (2008,2009)
 Sefton Novices' Hurdle - (2) Stromness (2002), Lovcen (2012) 
 Tingle Creek Chase - (1) - Edwardstone (2022)
 Maghull Novices' Chase - (1)  Balder Succes (2014) 
 Liverpool Hurdle - (3)  Spendid (2002), Blazing Bailey (2008), 	Yanworth (2017) 
 

 France
 Prix du Cadran – (1) – Trueshan (2021)

External links
Alan King's website

Living people
1966 births
British racehorse trainers
People from Wiltshire